The 1992 Tipperary Senior Hurling Championship was the 102nd staging of the Tipperary Senior Hurling Championship since its establishment by the Tipperary County Board in 1887. The championship began on 13 September 1992 and ended on 8 November 1992.

Cashel King Cormacs were the defending champions, however, they were defeated by Loughmore-Castleiney at the quarter-final stage.

On 8 November 1992, Toomevara won the championship after a 0–12 to 1–06 defeat of Thurles Sarsfields in a final replay at Semple Stadium. It was their 11th championship title overall and their first title since 1960.

Participating teams

Results

Quarter-finals

Semi-finals

Finals

Championship statistics

Top scorers

Top scorers overall

Top scorers in a single game

Miscellaneous

 Toomevara won the championship for the first time since 1960.

References

Tipperary
Tipperary Senior Hurling Championship